The Arkansas Department of Parks, Heritage, and Tourism (ADPHT) is a cabinet level agency in the executive branch of Arkansas state government responsible for promoting, protecting, interpreting, and managing the state's natural and cultural resources. The department was created on July 1, 2019.

References

External links

2019 establishments in Arkansas
Parks
Government agencies established in 2019
Organizations based in Little Rock, Arkansas
Arkansas